A killer feature or unique selling point is any feature of a product  or service that proves so useful as to make it indispensable. Examples include spreadsheets as a feature of the PC, or social networking as a feature of the Internet.

Analogous to killer application, which specifically refers to software as a killer feature of its compatible hardware (meaning that the software sells the hardware), the term killer feature often more specifically refers to software features that sell the software.

See also
 Killer application
 Unique selling point
 Vendor lock-in
 Use case

References

Computer jargon
Software features